Liang-Chen Proposal, or The Proposal on the Location of the Administrative Central District of the Central People's Government is a proposal Chinese architect Liang Sicheng and Chen Zhanxiang handed in to the Chinese Communist Party government in 1950, the full name of the document is "Suggestions on the location of central  government district".

References

 Wong, Sidney. "Searching for a Modern, Humanistic Planning Model in China - The Planning Ideas of Liang Sicheng (1930-1952)" Journal of Architecture and Planning Research 32(4): 324–345. 2015.

1950 in China